Uncharacterized protein CLBA1 is a protein that in humans is encoded by the CLBA1 gene.

References

External links

Further reading